Aaron David Ledesma (born June 3, 1971) is an American former professional baseball player. He played in Major League Baseball (MLB) as an infielder.

Playing career
Ledesma was drafted in the second round of the 1990 Major League Baseball Draft by the New York Mets.  Prior to the 1996 season, he was traded by the Mets to the California Angels for Kevin Flora.  Ledesma spent the 1996 season in the minors, became a minor league free agent after the season, and signed with the Baltimore Orioles in 1997.  He was drafted by the Tampa Bay Devil Rays from Orioles as the 62nd pick in the 1997 Major League Baseball expansion draft.  After the 1999 season, the Devil Rays traded Ledesma with Rolando Arrojo to the Colorado Rockies for Vinny Castilla.

Coaching career
Ledesma served as the hitting coach for the Class-A Advanced Tampa Yankees in 2008, and served as the hitting coach for the Triple-A Scranton/Wilkes-Barre Yankees in 2009 and 2010.

Post-playing career
Ledesma opened a yoga studio with his wife Karen in Clearwater, Florida, where they are instructors.

References

External links

1971 births
Living people
American expatriate baseball players in Canada
Baseball players from California
Baltimore Orioles players
Binghamton Mets players
Chabot Gladiators baseball players
Colorado Rockies players
Colorado Springs Sky Sox players
Columbia Mets players
Durham Bulls players
Kingsport Mets players
Long Island Ducks players
Major League Baseball infielders
New York Mets players
Norfolk Tides players
People from the San Francisco Bay Area
Rochester Red Wings players
St. Lucie Mets players
St. Petersburg Devil Rays players
Tampa Bay Devil Rays players
Vancouver Canadians players